The 1910 Mercer Baptists football team was an American football team that represented Mercer University as a member of the Southern Intercollegiate Athletic Association (SIAA) during the 1910 college football season. In their first year under head coach Charles C. Stroud, the team compiled an 6–3 record, with a mark of 3–2 in the SIAA.

Schedule

References

Mercer
Mercer Bears football seasons
Mercer Baptists football